Corythoxestis sunosei is a moth of the family Gracillariidae, known from Japan (Kyūshū) and China.

The wingspan is 4.4-6.7 mm.

The host plants for the species are Adina pilulifera, Mussaenda parviflora, Mussaenda esquirolii and Uncaria rhynchophylla. The larvae mine the leaves of their host plant.

References

Moths described in 1998
Phyllocnistinae
Moths of Japan